The John T. McNaughton Bridge, also known as the Pekin Bridge, is a steel girder bridge that carries Illinois Route 9 over the Illinois River from downtown Pekin to Peoria County in central Illinois. The John T. McNaughton Bridge was built in 1982, to replace a steel truss with a movable span. The bridge was constructed with a 75 foot clearance in order to allow river navigation, it has a length of 2,634 feet.

The bridge is named for John T. McNaughton, who was United States Assistant Secretary of Defense for International Security Affairs and Robert S. McNamara's closest adviser during the Vietnam War. McNaughton was also a Harvard Law School professor. He died in a plane crash at age 45, less than two weeks before he would have become Secretary of the Navy.

References

1982 establishments in Illinois
Bridges completed in 1982
Bridges in Peoria County, Illinois
Bridges in Tazewell County, Illinois
Bridges over the Illinois River
Girder bridges in the United States
Pekin, Illinois
Road bridges in Illinois
Steel bridges in the United States